Plasmodium bambusicolai is a species of the genus Plasmodium subgenus Novyella.

As in all species of this genus, it has both vertebrate and insect hosts. The vertebrate host are birds.

References 

bambusicolai
Parasites of birds